Bibio venosus is a species of fly in the family Bibionidae. It is found in the Palearctic.

References

Bibionidae
Insects described in 1804
Nematoceran flies of Europe